The Napoleon Bonaparte Broward House is a historic home in Jacksonville, Florida. It is located at 9953 Hecksher Drive, and was the residence of Florida governor Napoleon B. Broward. On December 27, 1972, it was added to the U.S. National Register of Historic Places.

References

External links

 Duval County listings at National Register of Historic Places
 Florida's Office of Cultural and Historical Programs
 Duval County listings
 Great Floridians of Jacksonville

Houses in Jacksonville, Florida
History of Jacksonville, Florida
National Register of Historic Places in Jacksonville, Florida
Northside, Jacksonville